The Organización de Trabajadoras Sexuales (OTRAS) is a Spanish trade union representing sex workers.

History 
OTRAS was formed in August 2018 and registered with Spain's Labour Ministry as a trade union. 

However, a number of anti-sex work activists opposed the formation of the union and instigated a campaign on social media against them using the hashtag #SoyAbolicionista (“I’m an Abolitionist”). Those groups then brought a court action against OTRAS, resulting on OTRAS's statutes being annulled on the grounds that there can be no employment contract for prostitutes and therefore they were not "workers" in terms of employment law, but the court did not dissolve the union. In February 2019, the Superior Court of Justice of Madrid ruled that a prostitute working in a club in Barcelona had a valid  employment relationship with the club owners. In June 2021, the Spanish Supreme Court overturned the ruling against OTRAS, thus confirming the union's registration as legal.

See also 
 Prostitution in Spain

References 

Trade unions in Spain
Sex worker organizations
2018 establishments in Spain